Andrei Ivanovich Streltsov (born 18 March 1984) is a former Russian footballer.

He played on either flank of defence or midfield, and sometimes used even as a striker.

Career
On 1 February 2010 FC Anzhi Makhachkala signed the Russian right-back from FC Khimki, already he played for Anzhi from 2006 to 2008.

References

External links
  Player page on the official Luch-Energiya website
 

1984 births
People from Tambov Oblast
Living people
Russian footballers
Russian expatriate footballers
Expatriate footballers in Latvia
Dinaburg FC players
FC Anzhi Makhachkala players
FC Luch Vladivostok players
FC Khimki players
FC Spartak Moscow players
FC Rubin Kazan players
FC Daugava players
Russian Premier League players
Russian expatriate sportspeople in Latvia
Association football midfielders
Association football defenders
FC Neftekhimik Nizhnekamsk players
FC Dynamo Bryansk players
Sportspeople from Tambov Oblast